Shishkino is a rural locality (a village) in Beryozovskoye Rural Settlement, Beryozovsky District, Perm Krai, Russia. The population was 53 as of 2010.

Geography 
It is located on the Shakva River.

References 

Rural localities in Beryozovsky District, Perm Krai